The Mini Small Outline Package (MSOP) a miniaturized version of the Shrink Small Outline ic package .

Application 
Many integrated circuits are available in the MSOP form factor. They are suited for space-limited applications requiring 1 mm or less mounted height and are commonly used in Disk drives, video/audio and consumer electronics.

Physical properties  
The size of the Mini Small Outline Package is only 3mm x 3mm for the 8 & 10 pins version and 3mm x 4mm for the 12 & 16 pins version. The small package offers a small footprint, short wires for improved electrical connections, and good moisture reliability.
Some versions have an exposed pad on the bottom side. The exposed pad will be soldered on the PCB to transfer heat from the package to the PCB.

Synonyms for the MSOP Package
 μMAX or micro max - Maxim name for the msop package.
 µMAX-EP or micro max exposed pad - Maxim name for the msop package with exposed pad.
 MSE - Linear Technology name for the msop package with exposed pad.

Similar package types 
 Thin shrink small outline package

See also 
List of integrated circuit packaging types

References

External links 

Semiconductor packages